Li Ting and Sun Tiantian were the defending champions, but decided not to participate this year.

Carly Gullickson and María Emilia Salerni won the title, defeating Els Callens and Samantha Stosur 7–5, 7–5 in the final.

Seeds

Draw

References
Main Draw

Challenge Bell
Tournoi de Québec
Can